The 1943 Pacific Tigers football team was an American football team that represented the College of the Pacific—now known as the University of the Pacific—in Stockton, California as an independent during the 1943 college football season. In their 11th season under head coach Amos Alonzo Stagg, the Tigers compiled a record of 7–2 and finished the season ranked No. 19 in the AP Poll. The Tigers played home games at Baxter Stadium in Stockton.

Schedule

References

Pacific
Pacific Tigers football seasons
Pacific Tigers football